Sukhda Pritam is an Indian judge, presently Chief Judicial Magistrate. She remained as Joint Member Secretary, Haryana State Legal Services Authority in 2020-21. She also remained Deputy Registrar(Judicial) for two years at National Green Tribunal, Delhi. She is Judicial Magistrate First Class from Haryana Cadre. She was earlier appointed as Additional Civil Judge (Sr.) Division cum Judicial Magistrate in District Courts Sonipat since 19 April 2016. Her Father Justice Pritam Pal is a retired High Court Judge and was later appointed as Lokayukta, an anti-corruption ombudsman body of Haryana. After serving as Lokayukta her father retired from services on 18 January 2016. She was transferred and promoted from Chandigarh to Sonipat on 13 April 2016.

Judge

She joined as a Judge and was appointed in Panchkula District Courts. She served there for a period of around 6 months and thereafter she was transferred on deputation to the Chandigarh District Courts where she served till April 2016. She earned many distinctions during her service as Judge in Chandigarh. She was known to be a Judge of strict discipline and was one of the Judges who started Video Conferencing in the District Courts Chandigarh while serving as Duty Magistrate. She handled many high-profile cases including trial of Kuldeep Bishnoi, founder of HJC, Haryana. Kuldeep Bishnoi charges were later dismissed. In 2015 she ordered medical examination of an accused who alleged custodial beating by Chandigarh Police during custody. She was praised all around area for her efforts for the accused. She was also praised for her letter to the Governor of Punjab regarding human trafficking due to which a big scandal of trafficking was busted in Chandigarh. Accused of theft of heritage furniture of Chandigarh were produced before her.

Lawyer
Dr. Sukhda Pritam practiced as a lawyer before the Hon'ble Supreme Court of India prior to her selection in the Judiciary. During her brief appearance before the Supreme Court, she was standing counsel for the State of Haryana and has many judgments to her credit. She represented the state in many high profile matters.

Other information
She has a flair of writing from her childhood days. She was selected for an international competition of poetry in 2002. Her poetry was nominated for world champion amateur poet in 2002 and also she was invited to USA. She belongs to influential Jat family of Haryana who are one of the main promoters of Arya Samaj in the State of Haryana. Daughter of Justice Pritam Pal, she herself is involved in many charitable works in Haryana. They are engaged in various social works including free medical camps, providing quality education to the needy and promoting cultural harmony by various methods. Her father recently donated various antique items to the museum of Kurukshetra University for preserving the same or usage of them in any mean devised by the university authorities. Her father launched Social Justice Front on Oct 2, 2016 to work for needy and for filing Public Interest Litigation on important topics. She has given presentations and lectures on Juvenile Law for its effective implementation at State Judicial Academy, Chandigarh as well as to police and various agencies at District Headquarters. She has also written a book on the latest Juvenile law enacted in 2015 with the title “Juvenile Justice in Indian Perspective”.

References

External links
http://www.greentribunal.gov.in/dy_reg.aspx
http://mhone.in/mhonenews/?p=27291
Hindustan Times
http://www.yespunjab.com/punjab/item/23435-vodafone-under-scanner--9-company-officials-summoned-for-cheating
http://archive.indianexpress.com/news/rohtak-shelter-home-io-sent-in-judicial-custody/978114/
http://www.tribuneindia.com/news/chandigarh/courts/relief-for-healthyway-fraud-accused/65325.html
http://www.tribuneindia.com/2002/20020121/ncr1.htm
http://www.tribuneindia.com/2002/20020121/ncr.htm
Hindustan Times
http://cslra.in/blog/2015/09/27/custodial-beating-in-chandigarh-court-of-dr-sukhda-pritam-takes-stringent-view/
http://cja.gov.in/News%20Letter/News%20Letter%202013.pdf
http://www.face2news.com/news/19096-heritage-furniture-theft-case-five-sofa-chairs-recovered-from-near-nahan-forest-area-mumbai-links-being-.aspx
http://freelegalconsultancy.blogspot.in/2012/06/service-law-date-of-birth-correction-of.html
http://www.amarujala.com/chandigarh/199-judges-of-district-level-courts-of-haryana-transferred
http://highcourtchd.gov.in/sub_pages/top_menu/dist_jud/pdf/list_of_all_judicial_officers_hr.pdf
http://mhone.in/mhonenews/court-rejects-dsp-raka-giras-plea/

1982 births
Living people
People from Panchkula district
21st-century Indian judges
Women educators from Haryana
Educators from Haryana
21st-century Indian women judges
Supreme Court of India lawyers
Maharshi Dayanand University alumni